Saint-Léon-sur-l'Isle is a railway station in Saint-Léon-sur-l'Isle, Nouvelle-Aquitaine, France. The station is located on the Coutras - Tulle railway line. The station is served by TER (local) services operated by SNCF.

Train services

The station is served by regional trains towards Bordeaux, Périgueux, Limoges and Brive-la-Gaillarde.

References

Railway stations in Dordogne